Marijan Bloudek (born 23 August 1951) is a Slovenian professional football manager and former player of Bosnian descent.

As a player he played for Rudar Kakanj and Čelik Zenica, while as a manager, Bloudek managed Čelik in the Yugoslav First League, Maribor, with whom he won the 1991–92 Slovenian Cup, Šmartno ob Paki, Paloma Sladki Vrh, Zrinjski Mostar, Široki Brijeg, Pomorac 1921 and most recently, Sloboda Tuzla.

Honours

Player
Čelik Zenica
Yugoslav Second League: 1978–79 (West), 1982–83 (West)
UEFA Intertoto Cup: 1975

Manager
Maribor
Slovenian Cup: 1991–92

References

External links

1951 births
Living people
Sportspeople from Zenica
Bosnia and Herzegovina emigrants to Slovenia
Yugoslav footballers
Yugoslav First League players
Yugoslav Second League players
FK Rudar Kakanj players
NK Čelik Zenica players
Association football defenders
Yugoslav football managers
Slovenian football managers
Slovenian expatriate football managers
Expatriate football managers in Bosnia and Herzegovina
Expatriate football managers in Croatia
Yugoslav First League managers
Premier League of Bosnia and Herzegovina managers
NK Čelik Zenica managers
NK Maribor managers
HŠK Zrinjski managers
NK Široki Brijeg managers
FK Sloboda Tuzla managers
Slovenian expatriate sportspeople in Croatia
Slovenian expatriate sportspeople in Bosnia and Herzegovina